Amos Baddeley (1885 – 1957) was an English footballer who played in the Football League for Blackpool and Stoke.

Career
Baddeley started playing football for his local amateur side in Fegg Hayes. He was signed up by league side Stoke in 1906 after poor finances lead to the club looking in the local leagues for players. He made his professional debut in a 3–1 defeat away at Sunderland in March 1907. Baddeley became a regular in the side the following season as he played 15 matches scoring six goals during the 1907–08 season. However Stoke's financial crisis worsened and the club entered into liquidation.

As a result, Stoke left the Football League and thus many of their players left the club. Baddeley joined Blackpool for the 1908–09 season before re-joining Stoke in the Birmingham and District league. He developed a prolific strike partnership with Arthur Griffiths as the two of them scored 60 league goals between them during the 1909–10 season. He played one more season for Stoke before leaving in 1912 to join Walsall. He later went on to play for Abertillery and became player-manager at Ebbw Vale.

Career statistics
Source:

References

1880s births
1946 deaths
Footballers from Stoke-on-Trent
Association football inside forwards
English footballers
Stoke City F.C. players
Blackpool F.C. players
Walsall F.C. players
Abertillery Town F.C. players
Ebbw Vale F.C. players
English Football League players
Ebbw Vale F.C. managers